Ephraim McDowell is a bronze sculpture depicting the American physician and surgeon of the same name by Charles Henry Niehaus, installed in the United States Capitol Visitor Center, in Washington, D.C., as part of the National Statuary Hall Collection. The statue was gifted by the U.S. state of Kentucky in 1929.

Another copy is installed at the Kentucky State Capitol.

See also
 1929 in art

References

External links

 

1929 establishments in Washington, D.C.
1929 sculptures
Bronze sculptures in Washington, D.C.
Monuments and memorials in Washington, D.C.
McDowell
Sculptures of men in Kentucky
Sculptures of men in Washington, D.C.
Statues in Kentucky